Beaumont is an unincorporated community in Athens County, in the U.S. state of Ohio.

History
A post called Beaumont was established in 1894, and remained in operation until 1908. The "finest group" of Indian mounds in the area were said to be located near Beaumont.

References

Unincorporated communities in Athens County, Ohio
1894 establishments in Ohio
Unincorporated communities in Ohio
Populated places established in 1894